Michael William Donald (born July 11, 1955) is an American professional golfer.

Donald was born in Grand Rapids, Michigan. He won 1974 National Junior College Athletic Association (NJCAA) title while playing at Broward Community College and also attended Georgia Southern University.

Donald's sole win on the PGA Tour was the 1989 Anheuser-Busch Golf Classic. He lost on the first playoff hole in sudden-death to Hale Irwin at the 1990 U.S. Open in Medinah, Illinois, after they had both finished the 18-hole playoff in 74. Donald missed a 15-foot par putt on the 18th hole of the Monday playoff which would have given him victory.

In the 1990 Masters Tournament Donald tied the record for the lowest opening round score in the history of the tournament, shooting an 8-under-par 64 to equal the lowest first round at Augusta by Lloyd Mangrum in 1940. Donald described his 64 at Augusta as "the round of my life" but followed it up with a second round of 82. He finished the tournament in 47th place.

In 2005, Donald turned 50 and joined the Champions Tour. His best finish on this tour was a T-24 at the 2008 FedEx Kinko's Classic.

Professional wins (3)

PGA Tour wins (1)

PGA Tour playoff record (1–1)

Other wins (2)

Other playoff record (0–1)

Results in major championships

Note: Donald never played in The Open Championship.

CUT = missed the half-way cut
"T" indicates a tie for a place

See also 

 Fall 1979 PGA Tour Qualifying School graduates

References

External links

American male golfers
PGA Tour golfers
PGA Tour Champions golfers
Golfers from Michigan
Broward College alumni
Georgia Southern University alumni
Sportspeople from Grand Rapids, Michigan
Sportspeople from Hollywood, Florida
1955 births
Living people